Steve Dillon (22 March 1962 – 22 October 2016) was a British comic book artist, best known for his work with writer Garth Ennis on Hellblazer, Preacher and The Punisher.

Early life 
Dillon was born in London in 1962 and raised in Luton, Bedfordshire. He was the oldest of three siblings, a sister younger by three years, Julie, and a brother younger by nine years who is cartoonist/costume designer Glyn Dillon.

While attending Icknield High School, Dillon first realised his potential as a serious comic book artist during the production of a school comic book called Ultimate Sci Fi Adventures with school friends Neil Bailey & Paul Mahon in 1975. His first strip in this comic was "The Space Vampire". This was followed by the Escape from the Planet of the Apes series.

Career 
Dillon got his first professional work at the age of 16, drawing the title story in the first issue of  Hulk Weekly for Marvel UK, later working on the Nick Fury strip. In the 1980s he also drew for Warrior and Doctor Who Magazine, where he created the character of Abslom Daak. He did a considerable amount of work for the comics 2000 AD and Warrior.

Along with Brett Ewins, Dillon started the seminal comic magazine Deadline in 1988, which continued for another seven years and was instrumental in supporting young, underground, comic artists such as Jamie Hewlett as well as championing and supporting new bands of the period such as The Senseless Things and Blur. Deadline is highly regarded for bringing underground comics and graphic novels into the mainstream during the 1990s. and can be considered as a precursor for publications such as Loaded and Dazed and Confused, as well as defining and promoting the nascent Britpop movement of the time.

In mid-1989, Dillon met writer Garth Ennis, with whom he eventually had his most notable professional collaborations. During a social gathering about a year later in Dublin, Ennis recalls, "After everyone else had passed out, we sat up 'til dawn and killed off a bottle of Jameson, talking about what we wanted to do in comics- what we thought could be done with them, what the medium was for. I can recall a sort of mutual 'Oh yes, you. You're the one. You get it.' This was to pay off handsomely in the years to come." With Ennis, Dillon worked on Hellblazer and, later, on Preacher which concluded in 2000 after 66 issues. Dillon also created the character Dogwelder, featured in Ennis's series Hitman, and the aptly named Sixpack and Dogwelder comic series, that ran from 2016-2017.

Preacher was made into a critically acclaimed TV show in 2016, starring Dominic Cooper. Dillon is credited as co-executive producer on the series.

Death 
Dillon's younger brother, concept artist Glyn, announced on social media on 22 October 2016 that Dillon had died in New York City. The cause was complications of a ruptured appendix. His death was met with an outpouring of grief and a number of tributes from the comics creator community, as well as the following statement from DC Group editor Marie Javins:

Dillon's long-time collaborator Garth Ennis paid tribute to Dillon thus:

The first episode of season two of the Preacher TV series is dedicated to Dillon.

Awards 
 1998 National Comics Award for Best Artist
 1999 Harvey Award for Best Continuing Series for Preacher
 2000 Eagle Award for Favourite (Colour) Comic for Preacher

Bibliography

UK publishers

Self-published 
Sci-Fi Adventures ( Dillon/Bailey/Mahon)
Issue #5 Nov 1974 "The Space Vampire"
Special Issue Feb 1975 " Escape From the Planet of the Apes" Chapter 1
Issue #9 Apr 1975 "Escape From the Planet of the Apes" Chapters 2 & 3
Issue #10 May 1975 "Escape From the Planet of the Apes" Chapter 4
Issue #11 June 1975 "Escape From the Planet of the Apes" Chapter 5
Issue #12 July 1975 "Escape From the Planet of the Apes" Chapter 6
Issue #13(final issue) Aug/Sept 1975 "Conquest of the Planet of the Apes" Chapter 1Ultimate Science FictionStory in #1–3 (1977–1978)

 Marvel UK Hulk Comic (magazine)Nick Fury stories in #1–19 (1979)

Hulk story in #2 (1979)
Ant-Man story in #48–49 (1980)Doctor Who MagazineKroton stories in #5–7 and #23–24 (1979–1980)
Plutar story in #9-11 (1979)
Ogron story in #13–14 (1980)
Abslom Daak stories in #17–20 and #27–29 (1980)
Moderator story in #84 and #86–87 (1984)Blake's 7Stories in #9 and #11–12 (1982)

 Fleetway 2000 ADJudge Dredd stories in Sci-Fi Special 1980, #205, #242–243, #305–307, #322–328, #353, #374–375, #393, #397–399, #404–405, #409, #443, #450, Sci-Fi Special 1986, #505, #511–512, #610, #702–706, #727–732, #783, and Judge Dredd Yearbook 1993 (1980–1981; 1983–1987; 1989–1992)
Ro-Jaws story in #189–190 (1980)
Mean Arena stories in #199–200 and #218–223 (1981)
Ro-Busters story in Annual 1982 (1981)
Rogue Trooper stories in #379–380, #495–499, #520–531, #535–539, #553–554, #568–572, #574–575, #589, #598–600, #602–603, #624–630, #633–635, Winter Special 1989 (as writer), and Rogue Trooper Annual 1991 (1984; 1986–1990)
ABC Warriors story in Annual 1985 (1984)
Future Shocks in #442, #479, #572 (as writer), and #588 (as writer) (1985–1986; 1988)
Hap Hazzard stories in #561, #567, #588, #609–610, and #1164 (1988–1989; 1999)
Tyranny Rex stories in #566–568, #582–584, and Sci-Fi Special 1988 (1988)
Bad Company story in #601 (as inker) (1988)
Harlem Heroes story in #671–676, #683–699, and #701–702 (1990)DicemanABC Warriors story in #2 (1986)
Diceman stories in #4–5 (1986)
The Comic Relief Comic One-shot (1991)

 Quality WarriorLaser Eraser and Pressbutton stories in #1–3, #5–11, and #15 (1982–83)
Marvelman story in #4 (1982)

 Deadline DeadlineStories in #1–20 (as editor) (1988–1990)

 Other IPC MagazinesScream! #8 (1984)Pyramid BooksSpitting Image: The Giant Komic Book OGN (1988)Atomeka PressA1 #5 and #6A (1991–1992)John BrownBlast! #1  (1991)

 DC Comics Main artistSkreemer #1–6 (as inker) (1989)
Animal Man #29, #33–38, #40–41, #43, #45, and #47–50 (1990–1992)
Hellblazer #49, #57–58, and #62 (1992–1993)
The Atom Special #1 (1993)
Legion Worlds #5 (2001)ContributorWho's Who: The Definitive Directory of the DC Universe #19 (1986)
Focus One-shot (1987)
Hitman #60 (2001)
Superman: American Alien #4 (2016)

 Vertigo Main artistHellblazer #63–76, #78–83, #157, #175–176, and #200 (1993–1994; 2001–2002; 2004)
Confessional One-shot (1993)
Heartland One-shot (1997)
Preacher #1–66 (1995–2000)
Cassidy: Blood and Whiskey OGN (1998)
Tall in the Saddle OGN (1999)ContributorVertigo Jam One-shot (1993)
The Vertigo Gallery: Dreams and Nightmares One-shot (1995)
Vertigo: Winter's Edge #1 (as interviewee) (1998)
Transmetropolitan: I Hate It Here One-shot (2000)
Vertigo X Anniversary One-shot (as interviewee) (2003)
Scalped #50 (2011)

 Paradox ContributorThe Big Book of Death OGN (1995)

 WildStorm Main artistWildcats #20–21 (2001)
Global Frequency #3 (2003)

 Marvel Comics Main artistThe Punisher: Countdown One-shot (2004)
Wolverine: Origins #1–25 (2006–2008)
X-Men: Hope One-Shot (2010), collecting:
Psylocke #1 (2010)
Dark X-Men #1 (2010)
X-Men Legacy #230 (2010)
X-Force #22 (2010)
Wolverine #304 (2012)
Incredible Hulk #8 (2012)
Avenging Spider-Man #11 (2012)
Thunderbolts #1–6 and #12 (2013)
Scarlet Witch #3 (2016)
The Punisher #1–6 (2016)ContributorDaredevil #1/2 One-shot (1999)
Scarlet Witch #4 (2016)
The Punisher #7 (2016)

 Epic Main artistDoctor Zero #5 (as inker) (1988)
Car Warriors #1–4 (1991)

 Marvel Knights Main artistPunisher #1–12 (2000–2001)
Punisher #1–7, #13–14, #18–23, and #32 (2001–2003)
Bullseye: Greatest Hits #1–5 (2005)
Punisher vs. Bullseye #1–5 (2005–2006)
Punisher War Zone #1–6 (2009)

 Ultimate Main artistUltimate X-Men #58 (2005)
The Ultimates 2 Annual 1 (2005)
Ultimate Avengers #13–18 (2010–2011)

 MAX Main artistSupreme Power: Nighthawk #1–6 (2005–2006)
Punisher MAX #1–22 (2010–2012)

 Image Comics 

 WildStorm Main artistGen¹³ Annual 1 (1997)
Gen¹³ Bootleg Annual 1 (1998)

 Other publishers Eclipse ComicsThe Johnny Nemo Magazine #3 (as inker) (1986)
3-D Laser Eraser and Pressbutton One-shot (as writer) (1986)Penthouse'''Penthouse Men's Adventure Comix''
 Kodiak story in #6 (1996)

Notes

References

External links 

Steve Dillon at 2000 AD online
Steve Dillon at Marvel.com
Drinking With the Boys: An Evening with Garth Ennis and Steve Dillon
Interview (1990), obituary (2016) and gallery of images

1962 births
2016 deaths
British comics artists
People educated at Icknield High School
Deaths from appendicitis
Marvel Comics people
DC Comics people